Countess Louise Wachtmeister (born 28 April 1978) is a Swedish entrepreneur, athlete, and political activist. She was President of the largest chapter of the Conservative Youth Party in Stockholm for four years, and has held elected positions with the Stockholm City Hall and Stockholm District Court. She is a gold and silver medalist in the Swedish National Track Championships, and in 2004 co-founded the social networking website ASMALLWORLD with her husband Erik Wachtmeister. Dubbed "MySpace for millionaires" by the Wall Street Journal, the network had 320,000 members in 2008.

Early life, education
Wachtmeister was born as Louise Austern in Sweden. In her youth she became involved in political activism, and served as President of the largest chapter of the Conservative Youth Party in Stockholm for four years. She also participated in two elections, including the election of Sweden's entry into the European Union in 1994. She later held elected positions with the Stockholm City Hall and Stockholm District Court. In 2001 Wachtmeister completed her master thesis on branding at the Stockholm School of Economics (Handelshögskolan i Stockholm). In 2001-2002 Louise worked at the JKL Group, a leading PR company in the Nordic region. Wachtmeister was a silver and gold medalist in the 400 and 800 meter relay in the Swedish National Track Championships, where she competed under her maiden name Austern.

Asmallworld
In March 2004, Wachtmeister and her husband Erik Wachtmeister co-founded the social networking website ASMALLWORLD. She served as Marketing Director and Director of Communications for the young company, and Erik served as CEO and Chairman. The website launched two years before Facebook was made available to non-college members, and was dubbed "MySpace for millionaires" by the Wall Street Journal. New members must receive an invitation from a pre-existing member with invitation privileges to be accepted. In July 2006, Wachtmeister and her husband hosted a 2nd anniversary party for the website at a private resident in Saint-Tropez, with over 1000 guests from ASMALLWORLD present. As of September 2007, the site had 150,000 users, including Naomi Campbell, Paris Hilton, and Tiger Woods. By May 2008, the number had grown to 320,000 members, with about 65% of members from Europe and 20% from the United States. By April 2010, the Wachtmeisters had ceased to be active with managing the website, and membership was in excess of 500,000.

She was named by Bon Magazine as one of 50 Swedes that were going to change the world.

Personal life
Wachtmeister is married to Count Erik Wachtmeister.

References

External links
Bestofallworlds.com

1978 births
Living people
Swedish nobility
21st-century Swedish businesswomen
21st-century Swedish businesspeople
Stockholm School of Economics alumni